Congo at the 2012 Summer Olympics may refer to:

Republic of the Congo at the 2012 Summer Olympics
Democratic Republic of the Congo at the 2012 Summer Olympics